Oumar Diakité (born 20 December 2003) is an Ivorian footballer who plays as a forward for 2. Liga club Liefering, on loan from Red Bull Salzburg.

International career
Diakité was called up to the Ivory Coast for a set of 2023 Africa Cup of Nations qualification matches in June 2022. He was removed from the squad on June 6, 2022, with a minor injury in training.

Career statistics

Club

Notes

References

External links
 
 
 Oumar Diakite at Liefering

2003 births
Living people
People from Bingerville
Ivorian footballers
Association football forwards
2. Liga (Austria) players
ASEC Mimosas players
FC Red Bull Salzburg players
FC Liefering players
Ivorian expatriate footballers
Ivorian expatriate sportspeople in Austria
Expatriate footballers in Austria